Moses de León (c. 1240 – 1305), known in Hebrew as Moshe ben Shem-Tov, was a Spanish rabbi and Kabbalist who first publicized the Zohar. Modern scholars believe the Zohar is his own work, despite his claim that he took traditions going back to Shimon bar Yohai and committed them to writing. His other works include Sefer ha-Rimon, written in Hebrew, and hundreds of pseudepigraphic responsa, commentaries, and Kabbalistic tracts which he falsely attributed to earlier authorities.

Life
Moses de León was born in León, Kingdom of León in modern day Spain, then united with the Crown of Castile. He might have been born in Guadalajara and his surname, then, comes from his father, Shem-Tov de León. He spent 30 years in Guadalajara and Valladolid before moving to Ávila, where he spent the rest of his life. Moses de León died at Arévalo in 1305 while returning to his home.

References

Resources
Kohler, Kaufmann et al., "Leon, Moses (Ben Shem-Tob) de." Jewish Encyclopedia. Funk and Wagnalls, 1901–1906, citing:
Ahimaaz Chronicle, ed. London, pp. 95 et seq.;
Adolf Jellinek, Moses b. Schem-Tob de Leon und Seine Verhältniss zum Sohar, Leipsic, 1851;
Grätz, Gesch. vii. 231 et seq.;
Abraham Geiger, Das Judenthum und Seine Geschichte, iii. 75 et seq., Breslau, 1871;
Giovanni Bernardo De Rossi and C. H. Hamberger, Hist. Wörterb. p. 177;
Moritz Steinschneider, Cat. Bodl. cols. 1852 et seq.;
idem, Hebr. Bibl. x. 156 et seq.
Avishai Bar Asher, R. Moses de León - Sefer Mishkan ha-Edut, Los Angeles: Cherub Press, 2013

1250 births
1305 deaths
People from León, Spain
Kabbalists
13th-century people from the Kingdom of León
13th-century Castilian rabbis
14th-century Castilian rabbis
Forgery controversies
Literary forgeries